Tabatinga Mayoruna is an extinct indigenous language of the Amazon basin, on the borders of Brazil, Peru, and Colombia. It is the most divergent of the Mayoruna languages of the Panoan family (Fleck 2013).

References

Indigenous languages of Western Amazonia
Panoan languages
Extinct languages of South America